The Rothschild Fellowship program is a prestigious grant awarded annually by Yad Hanadiv (The Rothschild Foundation).

The Rothschild Scholarship for Outstanding Young Researchers is a awarded since 1979 with the aim of helping outstanding young researchers with exceptional potential to advance in the field of scientific practice. The candidates must have received a PhD from a university in Israel.

The generous Rothschild scholarships are awarded to postgraduate students who wish to pursue postdoctoral studies outside of Israel. According to the Yad Hanadiv website: Most of the scholarship recipients have been integrated into academic institutions in Israel, among them they have gained a leading status in their field and some of them even hold academic leadership positions in Israel.

Categories
The scholarships are awarded in the fields of natural sciences, exact sciences, life sciences, humanities and social sciences and in the study of the brain, consciousness and language.

See also
 Yad Hanadiv
 Lady Davis Fellows

References

External links
 Official Website

1979 establishments in Israel
 Awards established in 1979
 Fellowships